Iwan Iwanoff (2 July 1919 – 7 October 1986) also known as Iwan Nickolow and Iwan Nickoloff Iwanoff, born in Kyustendil, Bulgaria and died in Perth, Western Australia, was an architect known for working in the Brutalist style. Iwan Iwanoff studied architecture in Europe before arriving in Perth to work as an architect. He became renowned for his design characteristic which is mainly working with concrete blocks.

Biography

Early years and education
Iwan Iwanoff was born in Bulgaria into an artistic family, with his father, Nickolai Iwanow, a journalist and a poet, and his mother, Maria, née Schopowa. Originally named Iwan Nickolow Iwanow, he changed it to Iwan Nickoloff Iwanoff during his educational years, and shortened it later to Iwan Iwanoff.

After enduring a period of training in the military, Iwan Iwanoff studied fine arts under a famous Bulgarian Watercolourist and was himself a fine painter. As a result of his talents, he was offered a scholarship to study Fine Arts . In 1941, thanks to his father's advice, he made a decision to study architecture at the Technische Hochschule of Munich, Germany. He designed an outstanding chapel for the final project which brought him high praise when graduating with a Diploma of Engineering and Architecture in 1946. With his remarkable abilities in drawings and innovation in expressing his design, Iwan Iwanoff soon became a well known architect and his concept was that "architecture was an art".

He married Dietlinde Hildegunde Zenns on 25 October 1947 in Laufen, Germany.

Working life
Iwan Iwanoff worked in Laufen as a caricature painter in the immediate post-war period before working with Emil Freymuth, a modernist architect in Munich, Germany.

Leaving Germany with the help of the International Refugee Organization, Iwan Iwanoff and his wife left Europe on the SS Fairsea which left Naples on the 7th of February 1950, and settled in Fremantle, Western Australia on 2 March 1950. His Munich qualifications were not recognised in Australia. But shortly after, he gained employment under Krantz and Sheldon as a draftsperson. Krantz and Sheldon were a large commercial architectural company which had a major focus on designing flats in Perth. Iwanoff did some private architectural projects during this time.

He became a citizen of Australia in 1956. He obtained a transfer to the Melbourne architectural firm of Yuncken, Freeman Bros, Griffiths & Simpson in 1960. He transferred to Melbourne with the help of an old friend from Bulgaria, who himself had studied with Iwan and had emigrated to Australia. The reason for his brief stay in Melbourne, was to obtain registration, after several unsuccessful attempts in Western Australia. After visiting Western Germany, he briefly joined Bund Deutscher Architekten Organization (Federation of German Architects) before returning to Perth, to work with Krantz & Sheldon, in December 1961.

In 1963, he started his own business which was known as The Studio of Iwanoff. He had become a member of the Royal Australian Institute of Architects in 1963 and soon became a fellow in 1972. He was interested in exploring concrete blocks in various ways which allowed him to create high quality designs, especially in houses. Although he has been described as working in the Brutalist style, this only reflects the sui generis nature of his work and the difficulty of fitting him into recognised architectural genres. While he favoured the aesthetic effect of unadorned concrete blocks, giving his buildings a superficial resemblance to concrete brutalist works, he had nothing to do with the brutalist ethic of prioritising and emphasizing the structural and functional aspects of architecture over its aesthetic side. Rather than eschewing art and aesthetics as the brutalists at least claimed to, Iwanoff remained an artist throughout his life, and took great care in deciding just how far individual blocks should protrude or recede, sometimes arranging them with his own hands on site during construction. His intention was not to push a theory or reject tradition but to embody what he saw as the timeless traditions of art in contemporary form. Indeed, his emphasis on ornamentation and his playfulness with texture, light and shade place him, if anything, in the Rococo tradition, one at polar opposites to the spare modernism of his time and place.

Iwan Iwanoff died in Perth on 7 October 1986. His body was buried in Karrakatta Cemetery.

An exhibition of most of his works was presented at the State Archives of Western Australia in 1991.

Notable projects

 1958: Schmidt-Lademann House, 22 Lifford Road, Floreat, Western Australia
 1959: Toschkoff House, 32 Donegal Road, Floreat
 1959: Golowin House, 47 Woodroyd Street, Mount Lawley
 1965: Paganin House, The Boulevard, Floreat
 1966: Iwanoff House, 16 Lifford Road, Floreat
 1967: Roberts House, 12 Yanagin Crescent, City Beach
 1968: Piccini House, 59 Guelfi Road, Balcatta
 1968: Feldman House, 81 Cornwall Street, Dianella
 1968: Shops/Medical Centre, Onslow Road, Shenton Park
 1968: Bursztyn House, 29 Booker Street, Dianella
 1969: Madaschi Residence, 53 Shannon Road, Dianella 
 1970: Featherby House, 41 Summerhayes Drive, Karrinyup
 1970: Murphy House, 14 Tranmore Way, City Beach
 1970: Booth House, 59 Oban Road, City Beach
 1971: Northam Town Council Library, Northam, Western Australia
 1971: Tomich House, 7 Dorking Road, City Beach
 1972: Tombidis House, 10 Craig St, Wembley Downs
 1974: Northam Town Council Offices
 1976: Marsala House, 38 Sycamore Rise, Dianella
 1977: Kessell House, 4 Briald Place, Dianella
 1978: Hi-Fidelity Recording Studio, 63 Thompson Road, North Fremantle 
 1983: Gelencser House, 7-9 Curtin Av, Cottesloe

References

Further reading 
 Black, R (2006). "Eastern Block, Monument: Architecture quarterly , 73 (52-56).
 Duncan, R (1994). "A Temple for Suburban Living", Transition, 44-45 (48-57).
 Duncan, R (2006). "Iwanoff, Iwan (1919 - 1986)", Australian Dictionary of Biography Online Edition, (ISSN 1833-7538, published online by Australian National University).
 Neille, S (2001). "Gelisher house and studio", Monument: Architecture quarterly, 43(104-105).
 Royal Australian Institute of Architects (1985). "The Architect, Western Australia", Wescolour Press, 25:4(22)
 Photographer: copyright photos by James Webb and Nate.
 Molyneux Ian. "Looking around Perth, RAIA , Perth, (1981).
 Duncan, R (1991). "The art of Architecture - the architectural drawings of Iwan Iwanoff" presented by the Library and Information services of Western Australia.
 London, G. and Duncan Richards (eds.)(1997) " Modern Houses - Architect designed houses in Western Australia from 1950 to 1960" School of Architecture and Fine Arts University of Western Australia.
 Rawlings, I. 'Iwan Iwanoff – tribute to architect, a look at some of his designs' "The Architect, Western Australia" Vol 26 No 4 Summer 1986 (21)
 Hatje Cantz - 'Living The Modern Australian Architecture (2007) ' A Swarm of Fish'(Page 8),  Edited by Claudia Perren and Kristien Ring; A Privileged Glimpse into Australian Architecture.
 Patrick Bingham-Hall (1999); AUSTRAL EDEN 200 years of Australian architecture - The Watermark Press,Pages (10),Abstract Geometry and Inventive Singularity (212).
 Karen McCartney (2007); 50/60/70 ICONIC AUSTRALIAN HOUSES Three Decades of Australian Architecture - Murdoch Books Pty. Ltd., (Pages)15-16,186-189,191.
 J.Bakaloff (1992); Only One Life - Autobiography of Jordan Bakaloff, Self published;  Front Cover Caricature of J.Bakaloff (1961), page 147 photo.

External links 
 6000 Times
 Australian Dictionary of Biography
 Perth's Best Architecture
 Map of Iwanoff Houses

Architects from Western Australia
Modernist architects
Modernist architecture in Australia
1919 births
1986 deaths
Burials at Karrakatta Cemetery
Bulgarian emigrants to Australia
People from Perth, Western Australia
People from Kyustendil
20th-century Australian architects
Technical University of Munich alumni